The Last Hunter is a 1980 Italian "macaroni combat"  directed by Antonio Margheriti and starring David Warbeck and Tony King. Initially made to capitalize on the success of The Deer Hunter, The Last Hunter marked the first Euro War set during the Vietnam War, as opposed to World War II like all previous entries in the subgenre.

While not prosecuted for obscenity, the film was seized and confiscated in the UK under Section 3 of the Obscene Publications Act 1959 during the video nasty panic

Plot
Following the suicide of his best friend, Captain Harry Morris (David Warbeck) accepts a final deadly mission to go behind enemy lines to destroy a radio tower that is broadcasting anti-war propaganda spoken by an American woman to American troops.

Cast
David Warbeck as Captain Henry Morris  
Tisa Farrow as Jane Foster  
Tony King as Sgt. George Washington  
Bobby Rhodes as Carlos  
Margit Evelyn Newton as Carol 
John Steiner as Major Bill Cash  
Massimo Vanni as Phillips  
Luciano Pigozzi as Bartender

Production
Unlike director Michael Cimino, Antonio Margheriti did not want to make a political film that was for or against the Vietnam War. He just wanted to make a Vietnam War film that was fun.

The Last Hunter was filmed in the Philippines in many of the same locations as Apocalypse Now. The film was extremely hard shoot due to heat, wildlife, and accidents on the set. Cinematographer Riccardo Pallottini later died in a helicopter crash during the production of a later Margheriti Vietnam War film Tiger Joe.

Releases
When The Deer Hunter was released in Italy, it was released under the title Il cacciatore (The Hunter). When Margheriti's film was released in Italy, it was titled Cacciatore 2, which led to critic Kim Newman commenting that this was ironic, as the film was more derivative of Apocalypse Now.

Reception
From contemporary reviews, Tom Milne of the Monthly Film Bulletin described the film as an "Italian parasite feeding on Apocalypse Now" as well as comparing the film to The Green Berets as the "Vietcong atrocities dominate the film with the same grim relish, and partly because ideological conflicts are reduced to the same platitudinous level." The review also commented on the action scenes, which were found to be "directed with [...] crude uncomplicated vitality".

References

Sources

External links

Films directed by Antonio Margheriti
Macaroni Combat films
Vietnam War films
Films shot in the Philippines
Films scored by Franco Micalizzi
1980s Italian films